Texas City is a 1952 American Western film directed by Lewis D. Collins and starring Johnny Mack Brown, James Ellison and Lois Hall.

The film's sets were designed by the art director Martin Obzina.

Plot

Cast
Johnny Mack Brown as Johnny Mack Brown  
James Ellison as Jim Kirby 
Lois Hall as Lois Upton  
Terry Frost as henchman Trag  
Lane Bradford as Hank  
Lyle Talbot as Captain Hamilton  
Marshall Reed as henchman Yarnell  
Pierce Lyden as Marshal George Markham  
Bud Osborne as henchman, stage driver 
Bill Coontz as soldier  
John Hart as 1st Sergeant 
Stanley Price as 2nd Sergeant
Lorna Thayer as Aunt Harriet Upton

References

External links

1952 Western (genre) films
American Western (genre) films
Films directed by Lewis D. Collins
Monogram Pictures films
Films scored by Raoul Kraushaar
American black-and-white films
Films with screenplays by Joseph F. Poland
1950s English-language films
1950s American films